Compagnie d'Occident may refer to:
 Compagnie d'Occident (Company of the West), 1717 renaming of Mississippi Company, a company that operated in French colonies in North America and the West Indies
Compagnie de l'Occident, a French Crown corporation that existed from 1664 to 1667 with the purpose to exploit the resources of the French colonies and compete with the powerful Dutch and English companies of the time